The Baltimore Colored Symphony Orchestra was an orchestra based out of Baltimore, Maryland, established for African American musicians and audiences. It was founded in 1930, with a grant from the city, and began performing in 1932. Its leader was W. Llewellyn Wilson, a prominent local music educator and author.

References
Baltimore Sun

African-American history in Baltimore
Disbanded American orchestras
Musical groups established in 1930
1930 establishments in Maryland
Orchestras based in Maryland